No Days Off is a third mixtape released by The Alchemist in 2006. The majority of the songs have guest MCs over his beats, though the Alchemist raps on five of the tracks.

The album features the styles of many different rappers, from the aggressiveness of Mitchy Slick and Xzibit on "Making Your Money" to the more introspective nature of the Dilated Peoples' Evidence on "Hot & Cold" or "It's Gon' Pop".

Track listing

The Alchemist (musician) albums
Albums produced by Evidence (musician)
Albums produced by the Alchemist (musician)
2006 mixtape albums